Heinrich XXIV may refer to:
 Heinrich XXIV, Count Reuss of Ebersdorf (1724 — 1779)
 Prince Heinrich XXIV Reuss of Köstritz (1855 — 1910)
 Heinrich XXIV, Prince Reuss of Greiz (1878 — 1927)